Entwurf (meaning "draft" or "design" in German) is the second single album by South Korean girl group Nmixx. The single album was released by JYP Entertainment on September 19, 2022, and contains four tracks, including lead single "Dice" as well as the track "Cool (Your Rainbow)", and instrumentals for both songs.

Background
On August 22, 2022, JYP Entertainment announced that Nmixx would release their second single album, through a promotional poster confirming its release date on September 19, 2022, seven months after their debut with the first single album Ad Mare.

The announcement was also accompanied by the creation of the groups Twitter account under the name of XXIWN.

On August 23, two new contents were introduced in a different teasing method using two accounts, where they posted an image of a game invitation to NSWER (fandom name) through its official account. The flat figures made of dark colors, dotted lines with an English text, says 'A mysterious adversary who appeared in front of the adventure to MIXXTOPIA'. On their Twitter account, they posted the phrase 'What is None minus 1?' on the same invitation.

Between August 24 and 30, a series of teaser posters were published daily, with a puzzle to discover the phrase behind the game.

Promotion
The girl group held a showcase at Yes24 Live Hall in eastern Seoul's Gwangjin District for the release of "Entwurf." The seven members performed their new lead track "Dice" and revealed its board game-inspired music video.

Track listing

Charts

Weekly charts

Monthly charts

Year-end charts

Certifications and sales

Release history

References

2022 albums
Korean-language albums
JYP Entertainment albums
Single albums
Nmixx albums